Stéphane Artano (born 9 March 1973) is a French politician serving as Senator for Saint Pierre and Miquelon since 2017.

Career
A member of Archipelago Tomorrow, Artano was elected to the president of the Territorial Council of Saint Pierre and Miquelon on 24 March 2006. He was reelected in March 2012 against Annick Girardin, who has been serving as Minister of Overseas France since 2017. He was reelected for a third mandate in this position in March 2017. On 24 September 2017, Artano was elected as the Senator for Saint Pierre and Miquelon, defeating incumbent Karine Claireaux. He took office the following 2 October.

See also
 List of senators of Saint Pierre and Miquelon

References

1973 births
Living people
Presidents of the Territorial Council of Saint Pierre and Miquelon
Archipelago Tomorrow politicians
Saint Pierre and Miquelon politicians
Senators of Saint Pierre and Miquelon
French politicians convicted of crimes
Politicians convicted of embezzlement